Erna Signe is a 1911 Swedish 12 metre class yacht. It was by designed by William Fife III and built by August Plym at Neglingevarvet.

Career
Erna Signe was launched in June 1911. Erna Signe competed in the 1912 Summer Olympics, helmed by Nils Persson with the crew Per Bergman, Dick Bergström, Kurt Bergström, Hugo Clason, Folke Johnson, Sigurd Kander, Nils Lamby, Erik Lindqvist, and Richard Sällström, finishing second behind Johan Anker's Magda IX.

In 1913, Axel Nygren re-designed the rig.

References

12-metre class yachts
Sailing yachts built in Sweden
Ships built in Stockholm
Sailing yachts designed by William Fife
1910s sailing yachts
Sailing yachts of Sweden
1911 ships
Sailing at the 1912 Summer Olympics